Årøysund is a village and statistical area (grunnkrets) in Nøtterøy municipality, Norway.

The statistical area Årøysund, which also can include the peripheral parts of the village as well as the surrounding countryside, has a population of 305.

The village Årøysund is located a few kilometres west of Torød, and has lent its name to the Årøysund urban settlement which covers the southern part of the island and has a population of 2,069.

References

Villages in Vestfold og Telemark